Streiff is a surname. Notable people with the surname include:

 Christian Streiff (born 1954), businessman
 Daniel Streiff, Swiss curler, European champion
 Patrick Streiff (born 1955), bishop
 Philippe Streiff (born 1955), racing driver
 Rösli Streiff (1901–1997), skier
  the horse of Gustavus Adolphus at the battle of Lützen 1632.

See also
 Hallermann-Streiff syndrome